The Norris University Center is the student union of Northwestern University in Evanston, Illinois, USA.

Naming
The building is named for Lester J. Norris, an alumnus of Northwestern University who died in 1967. In his memory, Mr Norris's parents contributed $2.5 million toward the construction of a student center on the recently finished lakefill.

Architecture

The center was designed in 1971 by Modernist architect Edward D. Dart, and has an area of approximately 150,000 square feet.

Community center
The Norris University Center provides services and programs.

Services hub
Norris University Center used to have a bar in it, but it was shuttered for both insurance and fire code reasons.

New Student Center Initiative
In 2010, a group of students began to campaign for a new student center to be built on campus, replacing the Norris University Center. The New Student Center Initiative is a student-led movement for the creation of a new student center. The initiative includes an ad hoc committee in which all Northwestern students are invited to apply, join, and contribute to the lobbying of the New Student Center.  According to their proposal, the New Student Center Initiative is driven by a belief that a new, state-of-the art student center located closer to the center of campus will help create a greater sense of community throughout the University. A new building designed with this purpose in mind, they argue, would include more venue space, meeting space, centralized student services, food options and general entertainment. In addition, moving the student center to the Garret parking lot would be more of a focal point for students to congregate on campus. Those who argue the necessity of building a new student center cite the positive effect of peer institutions' larger or more comprehensive student centers.

Responding to lobbies from the Undergraduate Budget Priorities Committee (UBPC), the NU administration has engaged the consulting firm Brailsford and Dunlavey to assess how best to rebuild, repurpose, or renovate the University Center to better serve students' needs. In the spring of 2012, the consultants are researching student opinion via focus groups and small meetings, which will then allow them to put together and distribute a large scale survey on the topic.

External links
 Official homepage

References

Northwestern University
Northwestern University campus
1971 establishments in Illinois
Edward D. Dart structures
Brutalist architecture in Illinois